Nikka Zaildar is a 2016 Punjabi romantic comedy film directed by Simerjit Singh, written by Jagdeep Sidhu, and starring Ammy Virk and Sonam Bajwa as the main lead roles and was released worldwide on 30 September 2016. It follows college student Nikka (Ammy Virk), who, while studying at Patiala College, falls in love with Manraj (Sonam Bajwa).

Plot 
Yadwinder aka Nikka is from a wealthy landlord family in rural Punjab and is a student at a college in Patiala. While there, he falls for Manraj but she refuses to engage romantically with him saying that she would only marry a guy that her family chooses for her. Nikka sends his friend Bhola as mediator to convince his and Manraj's family. As, Nikka is still studying so his grandmother refuses to entertain the notion of his marriage saying that he is young and not ready to marry. To convince her, Nikka quits college in the hope that the grandmother changes her mind but when she doesn't relent, he fools her into believing that he's having an affair with Shanti whom his grandmother disapproves of as a suitable match. Then, he sends Bhola again to convince her to consider Manraj who is from a far wealthier and reputed family. This time, the grandmother agrees and sends marriage proposal to Manraj's family. However, they fix his marriage with Manraj's older sister Seerat as they thought that the marriage proposal was for her. Nikka and Seerat are now engaged but neither of them likes each other and they want to break off the engagement but can't. Meanwhile, Nikka and Manraj fall in love when he convinces her that the marriage proposal was meant for her. Since they have no other option left, Nikka and Manraj elope which causes a comedy of errors at their houses. However, the couple has a last minute change of heart and return home which convinces their families to agree to their marriage instead.

Cast 
 Ammy Virk as Nikka/Yadwinder Singh
 Sonam Bajwa as Manraaj Kaur
 Karamjit Anmol as Bhola
 Nirmal Rishi as Nikka's grandmother 
 Sonia Kour as Seerat (Manraaj's sister) 
 Gurmeet Saajan as Manraaj's Taaya 
 Baninder Bunny as Gap (Nikka's friend) 
 Kishore Sharma as Nikka's grandfather
 Harby Sangha as Raama
 Sukhwinder Chahal as Nikka's father 
 Parminder Gill as Nikka's mother
 Nisha Bano as Shanti
 Sharry Mann (special appearance) as himself

Music

Sequel 
A sequel, Nikka Zaildar 2, was released on September 22, 2017.

References

External links 
 
 Facebook page

2016 films
Punjabi-language Indian films
2010s Punjabi-language films
Indian romantic comedy films
Films directed by Simerjit Singh
Films scored by Jatinder Shah
2016 romantic comedy films